Northside Boulevard Riverwall is a historic public improvement located at South Bend, St. Joseph County, Indiana.  It was constructed between 1935 and 1938 by the Works Progress Administration. It includes a 3,360 foot long fieldstone riverwall, a fieldstone, a fieldstone grandstand, and five sets of fieldstone stairways leading to the St. Joseph River.

It was listed on the National Register of Historic Places in 2006.

References

Works Progress Administration in Indiana
Buildings and structures on the National Register of Historic Places in Indiana
Buildings and structures completed in 1938
Buildings and structures in South Bend, Indiana
National Register of Historic Places in St. Joseph County, Indiana